The 2015 Aegon International was a women's tennis tournament played on outdoor grass courts. It was the 41st edition of the event, and was classified as a WTA Premier tournament on the 2015 WTA Tour. The event took place at the Devonshire Park Lawn Tennis Club in Eastbourne, United Kingdom from 22 June through 27 June 2015.

Points and prize money

Point distribution

Prize money

Singles main-draw entrants

Seeds

 1 Rankings are as of 15 June 2015.

Other entrants
The following players received wildcards into the main draw:
 Naomi Broady
 Harriet Dart
 Johanna Konta

The following players received entry from the qualifying draw:
 Lauren Davis
 Alexandra Dulgheru
 Marina Erakovic
 Irina Falconi
 Jarmila Gajdošová
 Christina McHale
 Polona Hercog
 Magdaléna Rybáriková

The following players received entry as lucky losers:
 Daria Gavrilova
 Monica Niculescu

Withdrawals
Before the tournament
 Timea Bacsinszky →replaced by  Anna Karolína Schmiedlová
 Angelique Kerber (viral illness) →replaced by  Monica Niculescu
 Petra Kvitová (viral illness) →replaced by  Daria Gavrilova

During the tournament
 Daria Gavrilova (abdominal injury)

Retirements
 Eugenie Bouchard (abdominal injury)
 Caroline Wozniacki (lower back injury)

Doubles main-draw entrants

Seeds

1 Rankings are as of 15 June 2015.

Other entrants
The following pairs received wildcards into the doubles main draw:
  Eugenie Bouchard /  Marina Erakovic
  Petra Kvitová /  Caroline Wozniacki
  Jocelyn Rae /  Anna Smith

The following pairs received entry as alternates:
  Lara Arruabarrena /  Irina-Camelia Begu
  Monica Niculescu /  Arina Rodionova

Withdrawals
Before the tournament
  Eugenie Bouchard (abdominal injury)
  Petra Kvitová (viral illness)

During the tournament
  Ekaterina Makarova (left Achilles tendon injury)

Retirements
  Jocelyn Rae (tonsillitis)

Champions

Singles

  Belinda Bencic def.  Agnieszka Radwańska, 6–4, 4–6, 6–0

Doubles

  Caroline Garcia /  Katarina Srebotnik def.  Chan Yung-jan /  Zheng Jie, 7–6(7–5), 6–2

References

External links
 Website

2015 WTA Tour
2015
2015 in English tennis
June 2015 sports events in the United Kingdom